The 2005–06 Wisconsin Badgers men's ice hockey season was the 57th season of play for the program and 37th in the WCHA. They represented the University of Wisconsin–Madison in the 2005–06 NCAA Division I men's ice hockey season. They were coached by Mike Eaves, in his 4th season and played their home games at Kohl Center. The team won the 2006 NCAA Division I men's ice hockey tournament, the 6th title in program history.

Season
Wisconsin entered the season with a great deal of talent on the roster but not much to show for their efforts. Despite having about a dozen players selected in the NHL Entry Draft, the Badgers had flamed out in postseason play over the previous two years. They also had to replace previous starter Bernd Brückler, though they had a capable understudy in Brian Elliott. Wisconsin received a top-10 ranking in the preseason, however, they were already being downgraded before they played a single game. They dipped even further when they split their opening weekend but after that the team began to pull together.

The team didn't play its second opponent until the fourth weekend of the season but the time off appeared to benefit the club. After dropping their second game of the season, the Badgers didn't lose again until December 9. Over a 14-game stretch, Wisconsin appeared to be unbeatable. Robbie Earl and Joe Pavelski led a solid offense but it was on the back end that the Badgers made their mark. As soon as he assumed the starting role, Elliot was nigh impossible to beat in goal. Through the first 16 games of the season, he allowed more than 2 goals in just 1 game and was leading the nation with a sparkling 1.38 goals against average. During that stretch, the Badgers had gone 7–0–1 against ranked teams, including two separate top-ranked clubs. The result was that by December, Wisconsin was the unanimous #1 team in the nation. A surprising loss to lowly Michigan Tech ended their streak but the Badgers won the next five game afterwards to pad their résumé.

With Wisconsin cruising to the top seed and Brian Elliott seemingly a shoe-in for the Hobey Baker Award, the team was dealt a serious blow in mid-January. After sweeping #5 Colorado College, Elliott was injured at practice when a teammate slid into him. The goalie was ruled out for 3-4 weeks and it fell to freshman backup Shane Connelly to hold the fort until then. Much to their misfortune, Wisconsin's next four games were against ranked teams and the Badgers fell in each match. After being thrown into the fire, Connelly recovered to earn three wins over his next four games before Elliott was finally able to return. Unfortunately, it took Elliott more than a week to get back into game shape and he ended up allowing 17 goals over a 3-game stretch, a little more than half of the 31 he had allowed in the first 22 games. With the Badgers unable to win a conference title at the time, the final weekend of the season would only serve as a tune-up for the postseason. Luckily, Elliott appeared to have regained his early-season form by allowing just 1 goal against a ranked St. Cloud State squad.

Conference tournament
The Badgers opened against Michigan Tech and completely dominated both games. While the score was close in the second affair, Wisconsin outshot the Huskies 76–41 and controlled both games from start to finish. They met North Dakota in the semifinal and got off to a good start, scoring twice in the first 11 minutes. The Fighting Sioux fought back and over a 6-minute span, scored three goals to take the lead early in the second. The teams exchanged goals at the end of the middle frame, leaving the Badgers just one goal short with 20 minutes to play. The third was a sleepy period with no penalties or goals. Wisconsin was unable even the score and saw their chance at a conference championship fade away.

Wisconsin took their frustrations out on regular season champion Minnesota in the consolation game, posting a 4–0 victory over their long-time rival. The win helped Wisconsin earn the top overall seed for the NCAA tournament (Minnesota got the #2 seed) and were given the best possible draw for their first game.

NCAA tournament
Elliott continued to roll in the team's match against Bemidji State, recording his seventh shutout of the season. The next game came against Cornell and the match pitting two of the top defensive teams in the nation lived up to its billing. Elliott and the Badgers looked to be in control for extended sections of the game and the Big Red were unable to solve the Wisconsin netminder. Unfortunately, The Badgers too were unable to score as David McKee stopped all 37 shots in regulation. The two teams continued to stymie one another in overtime and the game went on into the night. Just past the mid-way point of the third overtime, Jack Skille scored the game's first goal, ending the second-longest game in Badger history in their favor. The game is also notable for being scoreless for the longest period in NCAA history (111:13).

The extended match didn't harm Wisconsin's tournament chances as the team had a week and a half off before the start of the Frozen Four. Wisconsin lucked into a de facto home game for the tournament as Milwaukee was host for the championship rounds. In front of a very partisan crowd, the Badgers took on Maine and looked every bit of the world-beaters that they had earlier in the year. After exchanging goals in the first, Wisconsin was outshot in the second but still managed to score two special team markers to take a solid lead. The Bears cut into their advantage in the third but a pair of goals put the game out of reach and sent Wisconsin to their first title game in 14 years.

With the championship on the line, Wisconsin faced off against Boston College. The Badgers pressed the Eagles all game long, forcing BC to take 10 separate minor penalties, 8 of which led to Wisconsin power plays. It was, however, Boston College who got on the board first, opening the scoring 9 minutes into the game. Robbie Earl tied the game early in the second but, despite exchanging chances, neither team was able to score for the next 28 minutes. midway through the third, while on their sixth man-advantage of the game, Wisconsin's Tom Gilbert broke the tie and gave the Badgers their first lead of the game. Two additional BC penalties helped stall the Eagles' comeback attempt and Wisconsin was able to run out the clock with a 2–1 win, capturing the program's sixth National Championship.

Brian Elliott finished the season setting several Wisconsin records including goals against average (1.55), save percentage (.938), and shutouts (8), all of which are still program bests (as of 2022).

Departures

Recruiting

Roster
As of October 1, 2005.

Standings

Schedule and results

|-
!colspan=12 style=";" | Regular Season

|-
!colspan=12 ! style=""; | 

|-
!colspan=12 ! style=""; | 

|-
!colspan=12 style=";" | 

|-
!colspan=12 style=";" |

National championship game

(MW1) Wisconsin vs. (NE3) Boston College

Scoring statistics

Goaltending statistics

Rankings

Note: USCHO did not release a poll in weeks 24 or 25.

Awards and honors

Players drafted into the NHL

2006 NHL Entry Draft

† incoming freshman

References

External links

Wisconsin Badgers men's ice hockey seasons
Wisconsin
Wisconsin
Wisconsin
Wisconsin
Wisconsin
Wisconsin